Virtual reality in fiction describes fictional representations of the technological concept of virtual reality.

Fiction
Many science fiction books and films have imagined characters being "trapped in virtual reality" or entering into virtual reality. Laurence Manning's 1933 series of short stories, "The Man Who Awoke"—later a novel—describes a time when people ask to be connected to a machine that replaces all their senses with electrical impulses and, thus, live a virtual life chosen by them (à la The Matrix, but voluntary, not imposed). A comprehensive and specific fictional model for virtual reality was published in 1935 in the short story "Pygmalion's Spectacles" by Stanley G. Weinbaum. Other science fiction books have promoted the idea of virtual reality as a partial, but not total, substitution for the misery of reality, or have touted it as a method for creating virtual worlds in which one may escape from Earth. Stanisław Lem's 1961 story "I ( Corcoran)", translated in English as "Further Reminiscences of Ijon Tichy I", dealt with a scientist who created a number of computer-simulated people living in a virtual world. Lem further explored the implications of what he termed "phantomatics" in his nonfictional 1964 treatise Summa Technologiae.

A number of other popular fictional works use the concept of virtual reality. These include William Gibson's 1984 Neuromancer, which defined the concept of cyberspace, and his 1994 Virtual Light, where a presentation viewable in VR-like goggles was the MacGuffin. Other examples are Neal Stephenson's Snow Crash, in which he made extensive reference to the term avatar to describe one's representation in a virtual world, and Rudy Rucker's The Hacker and the Ants, in which a programmer uses VR for robot design and testing. The Otherland series of 4 novels by Tad Williams, published from 1996 to 2001 and set in the 2070s, shows a world where the Internet has become accessible via virtual reality. Virtual reality stories based upon video games have also become popular in recent years, such as the 2011 novel Ready Player One by Ernest Cline, which is about a virtual reality system called the OASIS that people use to escape from the grim reality of a dying Earth in 2045. Other recent examples include Conor Kostick's 2004 children's novel Epic and Louis Bulaong's 2020 sci-fi book Escapist Dream.

Film
The concept of virtual reality was popularized in mass media by movies such as Tron (1982), Brainstorm (1983), and The Lawnmower Man (1993). The .hack multimedia franchise is based on a virtual reality MMORPG dubbed "The World". The French animated series Code Lyoko is based on the virtual world of Lyoko and the Internet.

 Rainer Werner Fassbinder's 1973 film Welt am Draht, based on Daniel F. Galouye's novel Simulacron-3, shows a virtual reality simulation inside another virtual reality simulation
 The 1982 film Tron told the story of a computer hacker sucked into a digital world physically inside a computer system. He attempted to escape with the help of the titular hero, a computer program within that virtual reality.
 In 1983, the Natalie Wood/Christopher Walken film Brainstorm revolved around the production, use, and misuse of a VR device.
 The 1990 film Total Recall, directed by Paul Verhoeven and based on the Philip K. Dick story "We Can Remember It for You Wholesale"
 A VR-like system, used to record and play back dreams, figures centrally in Wim Wenders' 1991 film Until the End of the World.
 The 1992 film The Lawnmower Man tells the tale of a research scientist who uses a VR system to jumpstart the mental and physical development of his mentally handicapped gardener.
 The 1993 film Arcade is centered around a new virtual reality game (from which the film gets its name) that actively traps those who play it inside its world.
 The 1995 film Strange Days is a science-fiction thriller about a fictional virtual reality trend in which users buy illegal VR recordings of criminal offences recorded from the offender's point of view (POV).
 The 1995 film Johnny Mnemonic has the main character Johnny (played by Keanu Reeves) use virtual reality goggles and brain–computer interfaces to access the Internet and extract encrypted information in his own brain.
 The 1995 film Virtuosity has Russell Crowe as a virtual reality serial killer name SID 6.7 (Sadistic, Intelligent and Dangerous) who is used in a simulation to train real-world police officer, but manages to escape into the real world.
 The 1999 film The Thirteenth Floor is an adaptation of Daniel F. Galouye's novel Simulacron-3, and tells about two virtual reality simulations, one in another.
 In 1999, The Matrix and later sequels explored the possibility that our world is actually a vast virtual reality (or more precisely, simulated reality) created by artificially intelligent machines.
 eXistenZ (1999), by David Cronenberg, in which level switches occur so seamlessly and numerously that at the end of the movie it is difficult to tell whether the main characters are back in "reality".
 In the film Avatar, the humans are hooked up via advanced technologies with avatars, enabling the Na'vi avatars to remotely perform the actions of the humans that they wouldn't do on the gas-based planet Pandora.
 Surrogates (2009) is based on a brain–computer interface that allows people to control realistic humanoid robots, giving them full sensory feedback.
 The 2010 science fiction thriller film Inception is about a professional thief who steals information by infiltrating the subconscious. He creates artificial thoughts that are so realistic that once they are implanted in a person's mind, the person thinks these are their own thoughts.
 OtherLife (2017) - about a form of biological virtual reality.
 The 2018 film Ready Player One directed by Steven Spielberg is an adaptation of Ernest Cline's novel of the same name about a VR entertainment universe known as the OASIS. The film is set in the near future of 2045 James Halliday creates this virtual reality world called the oasis. Halliday left his immense fortune and control of the Oasis to the winner of a contest designed to find a worthy heir.

Television
 The Doctor Who serial "The Deadly Assassin", first broadcast in 1976, introduced a dream-like computer-generated reality, known as the Matrix. 
 The British BBC2 sci-fi series Red Dwarf features a virtual reality game titled "Better Than Life" that allows its users to experience a utopia. In the novel adaptations of the series, headsets for the game are treated like an illicit drug, and the main characters end up spending many years unknowingly connected.
 Saban's syndicated superhero television series VR Troopers also made use of the concept where the titular characters fight villains that seek to invade from the virtual world.
 The holodeck featured in Star Trek: The Next Generation is one of the best known examples of virtual reality in popular culture, including the ability for users to interactively modify scenarios in real time with a natural language interface. The depiction differs from others in the use of a physical room rather than a neural interface or headset.
 In the fourth episode of the fourth season of Sliders, Quinn Mallory and his friends land on a world where everyone uses virtual reality all the time.
 The cartoon series The Real Adventures of Jonny Quest features the virtual reality of QuestWorld.
 The 2012 anime series Sword Art Online involves the concept of a virtual reality MMORPG of the same name, with the possibility of dying in real life when a player dies in the game due to the side effects of the NerveGear. In its 2014 sequel Sword Art Online II, the idea of bringing a virtual character into the real world via mobile cameras is posed; this concept is used to allow a bedridden individual to attend public school for the first time. The next two sequels Sword Art Online  take place in "The Underworld", another virtual world made with "mnemonic visuals" and bottom up AIs known as "Fluctlights".
 The anime Accel World (2012) expands the concept of virtual reality using the game Brain Burst, a game which allows players to gain and receive points to keep accelerating; accelerating is when an individual's brain perceives the images around them 1000 times faster, heightening their sense of awareness. This series takes place in the same universe as Sword Art Online
 Episodes of Black Mirror have featured virtual reality:
 The episode Playtest features an American traveler (portrayed by Wyatt Russell) who signs up to test a revolutionary new gaming system developed by the video game company SaitoGemu, but soon can't tell where the hot game ends and reality begins.
 The episode San Junipero features a simulated reality set in different time periods at the titular beach resort town that the characters can inhabit, even past death, as seen with its main characters (portrayed by Gugu Mbatha-Raw and Mackenzie Davis). San Junipero is made by the company TCKR Systems as the robots there maintain it.
 The episode USS Callister features Callister Inc.'s MMORPG game "Infinity" that uses virtual reality from TCKR Systems. Utilizing virtual reality technology in his modded "Infinity" game, Callister Inc.'s CTO Robert Daly (portrayed by Jesse Plemons) portrays the captain of the titular ship from his favorite show "Space Fleet" where he orders around the crew members who are sentient digital clones of his Callister Inc. co-workers made from the Digital Clone Replicator that he has which scanned whatever DNA they had on an item that Daly secretly obtained.
 The episode Striking Vipers features two friends (portrayed by Anthony Mackie and Yahya Abdul-Mateen II) starting to have sex in a virtual reality fighting game called "Striking Vipers X." 
 In the fourth season of Agents of S.H.I.E.L.D., Leo Fitz created the Framework as a training program that was expanded into a virtual reality by Holden Radcliffe. When AIDA reworked the Framework, she created a virtual reality in it in where HYDRA ruled the world. After AIDA concluded her plan by creating a real body for herself, she arranged for the Framework to be deleted as its virtual inhabitants are slowly deleted. In season five, a possible future involving a broken Earth and the Kree ruling the Lighthouse had Deke Shaw rebooting the Framework allowing the Lighthouse's inhabitants to use it for leisure in exchange for currency. In season six, the Framework technology was used by a time-displaced Deke Shaw to create the virtual reality game "Remorath Rumble" that was produced by his unnamed tech company. "Remorath Rumble" enables the players to aid Quake in fighting the invading Kree and Remorath soldiers as well as flying a Confederacy Destroyer Ship.
 In the fifth season of Supergirl, Andrea Rojas' company Obsidian Tech started to develop the Obsidian Lenses that enabled the users to enter virtual reality. Though this was secretly a plot by Leviathan to secretly trap them in virtual reality. Leviathan's plot was thwarted by Supergirl and Lena Luthor.
 The 2019 version of The Twilight Zone had an episode titled "Downtime" that featured a virtual reality called "SleepAway". This virtual reality has people entering it when sleeping. When a man named S. Phineas Howell was using it while playing as a hotel manager named Michelle Weaver (portrayed by Morena Baccarin). When Howell had a heart attack while using SleepAway and is in a coma explaining why she has no memory of her real life as Phineas, a customer service worker on "SleepAway" named Tom (portrayed by Tony Hale) informs her that Howell has died and offers her a deal to remain awake as part of a deal to become an NPC. Michelle accepts the deal and continues her work as a hotel manager.
 The Creepshow episode "Night of the Living Late Show" featured the Immersopod invented by Simon Sherman (portrayed by Justin Long). The Immersopod is outfitted with hundreds of cameras that acts as a home theater, allowing people to immerse themselves into and interact with any movie they want with Horror Express and Night of the Living Dead as examples.

Radio
 In 2009, BBC Radio 7 broadcast Planet B, a science-fiction drama set in a virtual world. Planet B was the largest ever commission for an original drama programme.

See also

 AlloSphere
 Augmented reality
 Haptic technology
 Virtual body
 Virtual globe
 Virtual machining
 Virtual taste

References

 
Virtual reality